Max Hymans (March 2, 1900 in Paris – March 7, 1961 in Saint-Cloud), was a notable leftist French politician, member of the resistance, and director of Air France from 1948 to 1961.

Biography 
Max Hymans was born is Paris on the March 2, 1900. After his baccalauréat (A-level), he graduated from École centrale de Paris with an Engineering diploma, while following a law degree in parallel.

He entered as an Engineer and site manager of Clairoix close to Compiègne, Oise. He was in conflict with the delegate administrator concerning French workers salaries and their replacement with foreign workers that were even less paid.

On October 22, 1925, he applied as a lawyer to the Cour d'appel of Paris. He opened a cabinet specialised in counterfeiting cases and patents.

Gallery

Air France–KLM
1900 births
1961 deaths
Politicians from Paris
French politicians
Knights Commander of the Order of Merit of the Federal Republic of Germany